This article lists described species of the family Asilidae start with letter A.

A
B
C
D
E
F
G
H
I
J
K
L
M
N
O
P
Q
R
S
T
U
V
W
Y
Z

Ablautus 
Ablautus arnaudi Wilcox, 1966
Ablautus basini Wilcox, 1966
Ablautus californicus Wilcox, 1935
Ablautus coachellus Wilcox, 1966
Ablautus colei Wilcox, 1966
Ablautus coquilletti Wilcox, 1935
Ablautus flavipes Coquillett, 1904
Ablautus linsleyi Wilcox, 1966
Ablautus mimus (Osten Sacken, 1877)
Ablautus rubens Coquillett, 1904
Ablautus rufotibialis Back, 1909
Ablautus schlingeri Wilcox, 1966
Ablautus trifarius Loew, 1866
Ablautus vanduzeei Wilcox, 1935

Abrophila 
Abrophila whitei Daniels, 1987

Acasilus 
Acasilus tigrimontis Londt, 2005

Acnephalomyia 
Acnephalomyia andrenoides (Wiedemann, 1828)

Acnephalum 
Acnephalum cockerelli Curran, 1934
Acnephalum cylindricum Oldroyd, 1974
Acnephalum dorsale Macquart, 1838
Acnephalum futile Wulp, 1899
Acnephalum gracilis (Hermann, 1908)
Acnephalum olivieri Macquart, 1838
Acnephalum platygaster Loew, 1858
Acnephalum quadratum (Wiedemann, 1828)

Acrochordomerus 
Acrochordomerus aeneus Hermann, 1920
Acrochordomerus engeli Efflatoun, 1937
Acrochordomerus mediterraneus Kovár & Hradský, 1995

Acronyches 
Acronyches alexanderi Papavero, 1971
Acronyches fenestratulus Hermann, 1921
Acronyches geosarginus Papavero, 1971
Acronyches imitator Hermann, 1921
Acronyches maya Martin, 1968
Acronyches meruuna Papavero, 1971
Acronyches plutactites Papavero, 1971
Acronyches rarus Martin, 1968
Acronyches westcotti Martin, 1968
Acronyches willistoni Hermann, 1921

Aczelia 
Aczelia argentina (Wulp, 1882)
Aczelia infumata (Lynch Arribálzaga, 1880)
Aczelia tsacasi Papavero, 1971

Adelodus 
Adelodus nigrocoeruleus Hermann, 1912
Adelodus rufipes Hermann, 1912

Afganopogon 
Afganopogon lindbergi Hradský, 1962

Afroepitriptus 
Afroepitriptus beckeri Lehr, 1992

Afroestricus 
Afroestricus abyssinia Scarbrough, 2005
Afroestricus chiastoneurus (Speiser, 1910)
Afroestricus eminentis Scarbrough, 2005
Afroestricus fulaui Scarbrough, 2005
Afroestricus hamulus Scarbrough, 2005
Afroestricus insectaris Scarbrough, 2005
Afroestricus kimerus Scarbrough, 2005
Afroestricus macroscelis (Bezzi, 1906)
Afroestricus minutus (Bromley, 1936)
Afroestricus morani Scarbrough, 2005
Afroestricus persuasus (Oldroyd, 1960)
Afroestricus sadaukii Scarbrough, 2005
Afroestricus sankofa Scarbrough, 2005
Afroestricus variabilis (Engel, 1929)
Afroestricus varipes (Curran, 1927)
Afroestricus velatus Scarbrough, 2005
Afroestricus verutus Scarbrough, 2005
Afroestricus victus Scarbrough, 2005
Afroestricus vittatus (Curran, 1927)
Afroestricus vorax Scarbrough, 2005

Afroholopogon 
Afroholopogon africanus (Ricardo, 1925)
Afroholopogon anassa Londt, 2005
Afroholopogon argos Londt, 2005
Afroholopogon aspros Londt, 2005
Afroholopogon capensis (Lindner, 1961)
Afroholopogon chirundu Londt, 2005
Afroholopogon dasys Londt, 2005
Afroholopogon fugax (Loew, 1858)
Afroholopogon mauros Londt, 2005
Afroholopogon meilloni (Oldroyd, 1974)
Afroholopogon melas Londt, 2005
Afroholopogon pardosoros Londt, 2005
Afroholopogon peregrinus (Engel, 1929)
Afroholopogon tanystylos Londt, 2005
Afroholopogon uranopia Londt, 2005
Afroholopogon vumba (Oldroyd, 1974)
Afroholopogon waltlii (Meigen, 1838)
Afroholopogon xeros Londt, 2005

Afromelittodes 
Afromelittodes mimos Londt, 2003
Afromelittodes solis (Oldroyd & Bruggen, 1963)

Afromochtherus 
Afromochtherus anatolicus Londt, 2002
Afromochtherus annulatus (Martin, 1964)
Afromochtherus astiptus Londt, 2002
Afromochtherus atrox (Tsacas, 1969)
Afromochtherus fanovanensis (Bromley, 1942)
Afromochtherus griseolus (Oldroyd, 1960)
Afromochtherus kolodrilus Londt, 2002
Afromochtherus malawi Londt, 2002
Afromochtherus megastylus Londt, 2002
Afromochtherus melanurus Londt, 2002
Afromochtherus mendax (Tsacas, 1969)
Afromochtherus mkomazi Londt, 2002
Afromochtherus peri Londt, 2002
Afromochtherus rufinota (Martin, 1964)
Afromochtherus sathus Londt, 2002
Afromochtherus unctus (Oldroyd, 1939)
Afromochtherus zoropegus Londt, 2002

Afromosia 
Afromosia barkemeyeri Londt, 2015

Afroscleropogon 
Afroscleropogon armatus (Oldroyd, 1974)
Afroscleropogon braunsi (Oldroyd, 1974)
Afroscleropogon bullingtoni Londt, 1999
Afroscleropogon clementsi Londt, 1999
Afroscleropogon dilutus (Walker, 1851)
Afroscleropogon lavignei Londt, 1999
Afroscleropogon nagatomii Londt, 1999

Agrostomyia 
Agrostomyia dimorpha Londt, 1994

Aireina 
Aireina paradoxa Frey, 1934

Akatiomyia 
Akatiomyia eremnos Londt, 2013

Albibarbefferia 
Albibarbefferia albibarbis (Macquart, 1838)
Albibarbefferia armatus (Hine, 1918)
Albibarbefferia bicolor (Bellardi, 1861)
Albibarbefferia bimaculata (Bellardi, 1861)
Albibarbefferia cingulata (Bellardi, 1861)
Albibarbefferia duncani Wilcox, 1966
Albibarbefferia eximia (Bellardi, 1861)
Albibarbefferia grandis (Hine, 1919)
Albibarbefferia heteroptera (Macquart, 1846)
Albibarbefferia incognita (Forbes, 1987)
Albibarbefferia leucocomus (Williston, 1885)
Albibarbefferia marginata (Bellardi, 1861)
Albibarbefferia neosimilis (Forbes, 1987)
Albibarbefferia peralta (Wilcox, 1966)
Albibarbefferia quadrimaculata (Bellardi, 1861)
Albibarbefferia sagax (Williston, 1901)
Albibarbefferia sonorensis (Forbes, 1987)
Albibarbefferia tagax (Williston, 1885)
Albibarbefferia vertebrata (Bromley, 1940)
Albibarbefferia zonata (Hine, 1919)

Albicoma 
Albicoma kaptshagaica Lehr, 1987

Alcimus 
Alcimus aethiopicus Bigot, 1891
Alcimus anax Speiser, 1924
Alcimus angustipennis Loew, 1858
Alcimus brevipennis Ricardo, 1922
Alcimus cuthbertsoni Hobby, 1934
Alcimus limbatus (Macquart, 1838)
Alcimus longipes (Macquart, 1838)
Alcimus mimus (Wiedemann, 1828)
Alcimus nigrescens Ricardo, 1922
Alcimus nigropalpus Hobby, 1934
Alcimus porrectus (Walker, 1851)
Alcimus rubicundus Hobby, 1934
Alcimus rubiginosus Gerstaecker, 1871
Alcimus setifemoratus Hobby, 1934
Alcimus stenurus Loew, 1858
Alcimus taeniopus (Rondani, 1873)
Alcimus tigris Karsch, 1888
Alcimus tristrigatus Loew, 1858
Albibarbefferia vertebrata (Bromley, 1940)
Albibarbefferia zonata (Hine, 1919)

Allopogon 
Allopogon anomalus (Carrera, 1947)
Allopogon argyrocinctus (Schiner, 1867)
Allopogon basalis Curran, 1935
Allopogon castigans (Walker, 1851)
Allopogon equestris (Wiedemann, 1828)
Allopogon miles (Wiedemann, 1828)
Allopogon necans (Wiedemann, 1828)
Allopogon placidus (Wulp, 1882)
Allopogon tesselatus (Wiedemann, 1828)
Allopogon vittatus (Wiedemann, 1828)

Alvarenga 
Alvarenga icarius Carrera, 1960
Alvarenga matilei Papavero, 1971

Alyssomyia 
Alyssomyia brevicornis (Philippi, 1865)
Alyssomyia bulbosa Artigas, 1970
Alyssomyia frayleana Artigas & Parra, 2006
Alyssomyia limariensis Artigas & Parra, 2006
Alyssomyia misera Artigas, 1973
Alyssomyia pampina Artigas, 1970
Alyssomyia quinquemaculata Artigas, 1973

Amathomyia 
Amathomyia antennata (Banks, 1920)
Amathomyia persiana Hermann, 1912

Amblyonychus 
Amblyonychus flavifasciatus (Macquart, 1838)
Amblyonychus gracilis (Macquart, 1838)
Amblyonychus horni (Bromley, 1935)
Amblyonychus incisuralis (Macquart, 1838)
Amblyonychus lateralis (Walker, 1860)
Amblyonychus nigripes (Fabricius, 1787)
Amblyonychus ovatus (Martin, 1867)
Amblyonychus pulchellus (Bellardi, 1861)
Amblyonychus quatuorlineatus (Macquart, 1838)
Amblyonychus substitula (Walker, 1851)
Amblyonychus titan (Carrera, 1959)
Amblyonychus trapezoidalis (Bellardi, 1861)
Amblyonychus trichonotus (Wiedemann, 1828)
Amblyonychus wiedemanni (Schiner, 1867)
Amblyonychus yepezi (Carrera & Machado-Allison, 1963)

Ammodaimon 
Ammodaimon acares Londt, 1985

Ammophilomima 
Ammophilomima aequinoctialis Janssens, 1953
Ammophilomima areekuli Martin, 1975
Ammophilomima auripennis Janssens, 1953
Ammophilomima australis Martin, 1973
Ammophilomima basilewskyi Janssens, 1953
Ammophilomima bifida Martin, 1975
Ammophilomima contermina (Edwards, 1918)
Ammophilomima eumenoides Janssens, 1953
Ammophilomima evanescens Janssens, 1953
Ammophilomima flava Martin, 1975
Ammophilomima ghesquierei Janssens, 1953
Ammophilomima imitatrix Enderlein, 1914
Ammophilomima indiae Martin, 1973
Ammophilomima inflatus (Osten Sacken, 1881)
Ammophilomima kenyae Martin, 1973
Ammophilomima montana Janssens, 1953
Ammophilomima nubilipennis Frey, 1937
Ammophilomima occlusa (Meijere, 1914)
Ammophilomima pimolae Martin, 1975
Ammophilomima rufescens Frey, 1937
Ammophilomima siamae Martin, 1973
Ammophilomima simila Martin, 1973
Ammophilomima straeleni Janssens, 1953
Ammophilomima thailandae Martin, 1973
Ammophilomima triangulata Enderlein, 1914
Ammophilomima trifida Hsia, 1949
Ammophilomima truncata Martin, 1973
Ammophilomima vitiosa (Wulp, 1872)

Amorimius 
Amorimius barrettoi (Carrera, 1949)
Amorimius bicolor (Engel, 1930)
Amorimius martinorum (Artigas & Papavero, 1988)
Amorimius rubripes (Carrera & Papavero, 1962)

Amphisbetetus 
Amphisbetetus affinis Hermann, 1906
Amphisbetetus dorsatus Becker, 1913
Amphisbetetus favillaceus (Loew, 1856)
Amphisbetetus gederati Efflatoun, 1937
Amphisbetetus norrisi Paramonov, 1966
Amphisbetetus primus Paramonov, 1966
Amphisbetetus ruazi Theodor, 1980
Amphisbetetus sexspinus Tomasovic, 2008
Amphisbetetus trinotatus Paramonov, 1966
Amphisbetetus westralicus Paramonov, 1966

Anacinaces 
Anacinaces gigas Enderlein, 1914
Anacinaces nahaeoensis Tomosovic & Grootaert, 2003
Anacinaces ochriventris (Becker, 1925)
Anacinaces rufiventris (Macquart, 1838)

Anarmostus 
Anarmostus iopterus (Wiedemann, 1828)

Anarolius 
Anarolius bicolor Theodor, 1980
Anarolius fronto Loew, 1873
Anarolius jamshidi Abbassian-Lintzen, 1964
Anarolius jubatus Loew, 1844
Anarolius rufescens Theodor, 1980
Anarolius setitarsis Richter, 1963

Anasillomos 
Anasillomos chrysopos Londt, 1983

Ancylorhynchus 
Ancylorhynchus argyrogaster (Séguy, 1932)
Ancylorhynchus bicolor (Becker, 1913)
Ancylorhynchus braunsi Bromley, 1936
Ancylorhynchus brussensis (Schiner, 1867)
Ancylorhynchus cambodgiensis Tomasovic, 2006
Ancylorhynchus cingulatus (Rondani, 1846)
Ancylorhynchus cruciger (Loew, 1858)
Ancylorhynchus crux Bezzi, 1908
Ancylorhynchus elbaiensis (Efflatoun, 1937)
Ancylorhynchus elbaiensis Efflatoun, 1937
Ancylorhynchus farinosus (Becker, 1913)
Ancylorhynchus fulvicollis (Bigot, 1879)
Ancylorhynchus funebris Bromley, 1936
Ancylorhynchus glaucius (Rossi, 1790)
Ancylorhynchus glaucius tristis (Séguy, 1932)
Ancylorhynchus gummigutta (Becker, 1906)
Ancylorhynchus humeralis (Wiedemann, 1821)
Ancylorhynchus hylaeiformis Speiser, 1910
Ancylorhynchus insignis Bromley, 1936
Ancylorhynchus limbatus (Fabricius, 1794)
Ancylorhynchus longicornis (Schiner, 1867)
Ancylorhynchus maculatus (Bigot, 1879)
Ancylorhynchus magnificus Bromley, 1936
Ancylorhynchus minus Shi, 1995
Ancylorhynchus munroi Bromley, 1936
Ancylorhynchus nomadus (Wiedemann, 1828)
Ancylorhynchus nyukinus Speiser, 1910
Ancylorhynchus oldroydi Lindner, 1961
Ancylorhynchus orientalis Shi, 1995
Ancylorhynchus percheronii (Macquart, 1834)
Ancylorhynchus plecioides Meijere, 1913
Ancylorhynchus pretoriensis Bromley, 1936
Ancylorhynchus prunus Oldroyd, 1974
Ancylorhynchus quadrimaculatus (Loew, 1858)
Ancylorhynchus reynaudii (Macquart, 1838)
Ancylorhynchus rufipes Meijere, 1913
Ancylorhynchus rufithorax (Doleschall, 1858)
Ancylorhynchus rufocinctus (Séguy, 1930)
Ancylorhynchus senes (Dufour, 1833)
Ancylorhynchus striatus Oldroyd, 1970
Ancylorhynchus susurrus (Karsch, 1879)
Ancylorhynchus tricolor (Loew, 1863)
Ancylorhynchus unifasciatus (Loew, 1858)
Ancylorhynchus variegatus (Bigot, 1879)
Ancylorhynchus vultur (Séguy, 1930)
Ancylorhynchus zonalis Bromley, 1936

Andrenosoma 
Andrenosoma albibarbe (Meigen, 1820)
Andrenosoma albopilosum Villeneuve, 1911
Andrenosoma appendiculatum (Macquart, 1846)
Andrenosoma atrum (Linnaeus, 1758, 1758)
Andrenosoma avicenniae Farr, 1965
Andrenosoma batesi Bromley, 1931
Andrenosoma bayardi Séguy, 1952
Andrenosoma boranicum Corti, 1895
Andrenosoma camposi Curran, 1931
Andrenosoma chalybeum Williston, 1885
Andrenosoma choprai Bromley, 1935
Andrenosoma cinctum (Bellardi, 1861)
Andrenosoma cinereum (Bellardi, 1861)
Andrenosoma complexum Oldroyd, 1970
Andrenosoma corallium Martin, 1966
Andrenosoma cornutum Oldroyd, 1972
Andrenosoma cruentum (McAtee, 1919)
Andrenosoma currani Bromley, 1931
Andrenosoma cyrtophorum (Hermann, 1912)
Andrenosoma cyrtoxys Séguy, 1952
Andrenosoma dayi (Paramonov, 1958)
Andrenosoma erax Bromley, 1934
Andrenosoma erythrogaster (Wiedemann, 1828)
Andrenosoma erythropyga (Wiedemann, 1828)
Andrenosoma flamipenne Bromley, 1931
Andrenosoma formidolosum (Walker, 1860)
Andrenosoma fulvicaudum (Say, 1823)
Andrenosoma heros Bromley, 1931
Andrenosoma hesperium Martin, 1966
Andrenosoma igneum Bromley, 1929
Andrenosoma irigense Oldroyd, 1972
Andrenosoma jenisi Kovár & Hradský, 1996
Andrenosoma leucogenys Séguy, 1952
Andrenosoma lewisi Farr, 1965
Andrenosoma mesoxantha (Wiedemann, 1828)
Andrenosoma modestum (Paramonov, 1958)
Andrenosoma nigrum Bromley, 1931
Andrenosoma olbum (Walker, 1849)
Andrenosoma otanegawanum (Matsumura, 1916)
Andrenosoma phoenicogaster (Hermann, 1912)
Andrenosoma purpurascens (Walker, 1856)
Andrenosoma pusillum Hermann, 1906
Andrenosoma pygophora Schiner, 1868
Andrenosoma pyrrhacra (Wiedemann, 1828)
Andrenosoma pyrrhopyga (Wiedemann, 1828)
Andrenosoma quadrimaculatum Bromley, 1929
Andrenosoma queenslandi (Ricardo, 1918)
Andrenosoma rubidapex (Hermann, 1912)
Andrenosoma rubidum (Williston, 1901)
Andrenosoma ruficaudum (Williston, 1885)
Andrenosoma rufipenne (Wiedemann, 1828)
Andrenosoma rufiventre (Blanchard, 1852)
Andrenosoma sarcophagum (Hermann, 1912)
Andrenosoma serpentinum (Bezzi, 1908)
Andrenosoma serratum Hermann, 1906
Andrenosoma sexpunctatum (Williston, 1901)
Andrenosoma sicarium (McAtee, 1919)
Andrenosoma subheros Bromley, 1931
Andrenosoma tectamum (Walker, 1849)
Andrenosoma trigoniferum Hermann, 1906
Andrenosoma valentinae Richter, 1985
Andrenosoma varipes (Banks, 1920)
Andrenosoma violaceum (Fabricius, 1781)
Andrenosoma xanthocnemum (Wiedemann, 1828)

Aneomochtherus 
Aneomochtherus acratus (Tsacas, 1968)
Aneomochtherus aegaeus (Tsacas, 1965)
Aneomochtherus aegyptius (Macquart, 1838)
Aneomochtherus aerifacies (Tsacas, 1968)
Aneomochtherus africanus (Ricardo, 1919)
Aneomochtherus alexisi Tomasovic, 2004
Aneomochtherus arabicus (Macquart, 1838)
Aneomochtherus atripes (Oldroyd, 1958)
Aneomochtherus baratovi Lehr, 1996
Aneomochtherus brevipennis (Séguy, 1932)
Aneomochtherus confusus (Tsacas, 1965)
Aneomochtherus cythereius (Tsacas, 1965)
Aneomochtherus darvasicus Lehr, 1996
Aneomochtherus deserticolus (Karsch, 1888)
Aneomochtherus desertorum (Lehr, 1958)
Aneomochtherus difficilis Lehr, 1996
Aneomochtherus farinosus (Loew, 1871)
Aneomochtherus flavicornis (Ruthe, 1831)
Aneomochtherus flavipes (Meigen, 1820)
Aneomochtherus granitis (Tsacas, 1963)
Aneomochtherus grisescens (Tsacas, 1968)
Aneomochtherus hauseri (Engel, 1927)
Aneomochtherus hermonensis (Theodor, 1980)
Aneomochtherus hungaricus (Engel, 1927)
Aneomochtherus hybopygus (Tsacas, 1968)
Aneomochtherus illustris (Schiner, 1867)
Aneomochtherus kompancevae Lehr, 1996
Aneomochtherus lepidus (Loew, 1871)
Aneomochtherus leucophorus (Tsacas, 1963)
Aneomochtherus libanonensis (Tsacas, 1968)
Aneomochtherus macropygus (Tsacas, 1968)
Aneomochtherus marikovskii (Lehr, 1958)
Aneomochtherus mesopotamicus (Janssens, 1961)
Aneomochtherus micrasiaticus (Tsacas, 1968)
Aneomochtherus monobia (Speiser, 1910)
Aneomochtherus mundus (Loew, 1849)
Aneomochtherus nairicus (Richter, 1962)
Aneomochtherus ochriventris (Loew, 1854)
Aneomochtherus oschii Lehr, 1996
Aneomochtherus perplexus (Becker, 1923)
Aneomochtherus petrishtshevae (Stackelberg, 1937)
Aneomochtherus platypygus (Tsacas, 1968)
Aneomochtherus psathyrus (Tsacas, 1968)
Aneomochtherus pygaeus (Tsacas, 1963)
Aneomochtherus quettanus (Tsacas, 1963)
Aneomochtherus rhogmopygus (Tsacas, 1965)
Aneomochtherus rubipygus (Lehr, 1972)
Aneomochtherus sahariensis (Tsacas, 1968)
Aneomochtherus sinensis (Ricardo, 1919)
Aneomochtherus soleus (Tsacas, 1968)
Aneomochtherus stackelbergi (Lehr, 1958)
Aneomochtherus tenuis (Tsacas, 1968)
Aneomochtherus tricuspidatus (Engel, 1927)

Anisopogon 
Anisopogon asiaticus 
Anisopogon glabellus 
Anisopogon gracillimus 
Anisopogon hermanni 
Anisopogon parvus 
Anisopogon pulcher

Annamyia 
Annamyia maren

Anoplothyrea 
Anoplothyrea indiana 
Anoplothyrea javana

Antipalus 
Antipalus bilobus 
Antipalus graecus 
Antipalus krueperi 
Antipalus reginae 
Antipalus similis 
Antipalus sinuatus 
Antipalus truncatus 
Antipalus varipes 
Antipalus weinbergae 
Antipalus wieneckii

Antiphrisson 
Antiphrisson accessus 
Antiphrisson adpressus 
Antiphrisson adpressus 
Antiphrisson alaschanicus 
Antiphrisson alpicola 
Antiphrisson aspereum 
Antiphrisson breviaristatus 
Antiphrisson charanchoicus 
Antiphrisson erenitus 
Antiphrisson fossilis 
Antiphrisson fuligineus 
Antiphrisson grunini 
Antiphrisson koo 
Antiphrisson malkovskii 
Antiphrisson mica 
Antiphrisson minor 
Antiphrisson minor 
Antiphrisson mitjaevi 
Antiphrisson mongolicus 
Antiphrisson mongolicus 
Antiphrisson monstrosus 
Antiphrisson mujuncumus 
Antiphrisson niger 
Antiphrisson pecinensis 
Antiphrisson schurovenkovi 
Antiphrisson semivillosus 
Antiphrisson solex 
Antiphrisson tenebrosus 
Antiphrisson trifarius 
Antiphrisson zaitzevi

Antiscylaticus 
 Antiscylaticus snowi Londt, 2010

Anypodetus 
Anypodetus arachnoides 
Anypodetus fasciatus 
Anypodetus fascipennis 
Anypodetus leucothrix 
Anypodetus macroceros 
Anypodetus nigrifacies 
Anypodetus phalaros 
Anypodetus unicolor

Apachekolos 
Apachekolos clavipes 
Apachekolos confusio 
Apachekolos crinita 
Apachekolos flaventis 
Apachekolos invasa 
Apachekolos magna 
Apachekolos scapularis 
Apachekolos tenuipes 
Apachekolos volubilis 
Apachekolos vultus 
Apachekolos weslacensis

Aphamartania 
Aphamartania breviventris 
Aphamartania digna 
Aphamartania flavipennis 
Aphamartania frauenfeldi 
Aphamartania knutsoni 
Aphamartania maculipennis 
Aphamartania marga

Aphestia 
Aphestia annulipes 
Aphestia chalybaea 
Aphestia nigra

Aphistina 
Aphistina balabacensis 
Aphistina partita

Aphractia 
Aphractia longicornis 
Aphractia rubida 
Aphractia vivax

Aplestobroma 
Aplestobroma avidum

Apoclea 
Apoclea albipila 
Apoclea algira 
Apoclea approximata 
Apoclea autumnalis 
Apoclea conicera 
Apoclea continuata 
Apoclea duplicata 
Apoclea femoralis 
Apoclea helvipes 
Apoclea heteroclita 
Apoclea inarticulata 
Apoclea indica 
Apoclea micracantha 
Apoclea obscura 
Apoclea pakistanicus 
Apoclea parvula 
Apoclea plurisetosa 
Apoclea rajasthanensis 
Apoclea treibensis 
Apoclea trivialis

Apolastauroides 
Apolastauroides kamakusa

Apothechyla 
Apothechyla carbo 
Apothechyla claripennis 
Apothechyla nigrina

Apotinocerus 
Apotinocerus brevistylatus

Apoxyria 
Apoxyria americana 
Apoxyria apicata

Araiopogon 
Araiopogon carbonarius 
Araiopogon choapensis 
Araiopogon fraternus 
Araiopogon gayi 
Araiopogon melisoma 
Araiopogon perniger

Araucopogon 
Araucopogon cyanogaster

Araujoa 
Araujoa pernambucana

Archilaphria 
Archilaphria ava 
Archilaphria jianfenglingensis

Archilestris 
Archilestris capnoptera 
Archilestris excellens 
Archilestris geijskesi 
Archilestris magnificus 
Archilestris wenzeli

Archilestroides 
Archilestroides guimaraesi

Argillemisca 
Argillemisca pilosa 
Argillemisca transcaspica

Argyrochira 
Argyrochira bactriana

Argyropogon 
Argyropogon argentinus

Aridefferia 
Aridefferia apache 
Aridefferia arida 
Aridefferia basingeri 
Aridefferia coulei 
Aridefferia cuervana 
Aridefferia harveyi 
Aridefferia pinali 
Aridefferia prattii 
Aridefferia snowi 
Aridefferia subarida 
Aridefferia subpilosa 
Aridefferia tolandi

Aristofolia 
Aristofolia lapila

Artigasus 
Artigasus concepcionensis 
Artigasus schlingeri 
Artigasus veredus

Asicya 
Asicya fasciata

Asilella 
Asilella karafutonis 
Asilella londti 
Asilella sonorus

Asiloephesus 
Asiloephesus excisus

Asilopsis 
Asilopsis fuscula

Asilus 
Asilus aethiops 
Asilus albipilosus 
Asilus albitarsatus 
Asilus amelanchieris 
Asilus angustialis 
Asilus antiphus 
Asilus antiquus 
Asilus appendiculatus 
Asilus aquaticus 
Asilus astutus 
Asilus auripilus 
Asilus baikalensis 
Asilus barbarus 
Asilus bicinctus 
Asilus bicolor 
Asilus bicolor 
Asilus bipartitus 
Asilus bojus 
Asilus bombylius 
Asilus bombylius 
Asilus brunneitibius 
Asilus caeruleiventris 
Asilus carolinae 
Asilus cinereus 
Asilus citus 
Asilus claripes 
Asilus colombiae 
Asilus comosus 
Asilus consanguineus 
Asilus crabroniformis 
Asilus curculionis 
Asilus cyanus 
Asilus delicatulus 
Asilus deperditus 
Asilus dioctriaeformis 
Asilus enitens 
Asilus erax 
Asilus fallaciosus 
Asilus fasciatus 
Asilus fattigi 
Asilus festivus 
Asilus filiferus 
Asilus filiformis 
Asilus flavipes 
Asilus florissantinus 
Asilus forficula 
Asilus frosti 
Asilus fulvus 
Asilus fuscipes 
Asilus gabonicus 
Asilus gamaxus 
Asilus glaucus 
Asilus gracilipes 
Asilus gurnetensis 
Asilus herdonius 
Asilus hopponis 
Asilus hubbelli 
Asilus humilis 
Asilus ignauus 
Asilus ignotus 
Asilus imitator 
Asilus inamatus 
Asilus incomptus 
Asilus laetus 
Asilus lebasii 
Asilus limbipennis 
Asilus litoralis 
Asilus longicella 
Asilus lucidus 
Asilus lusitanicus 
Asilus maculatus 
Asilus marginatus 
Asilus marginatus 
Asilus marginellus 
Asilus maurus 
Asilus megastylus 
Asilus melanacrus 
Asilus melanotarsus 
Asilus melanotrichus 
Asilus mellipes 
Asilus mexicanus 
Asilus misao 
Asilus morio 
Asilus morio 
Asilus natalicus 
Asilus nebulosus 
Asilus nigellus 
Asilus nigerrimus 
Asilus nigribarbis 
Asilus nigrinus 
Asilus obscurellus 
Asilus okinawensis 
Asilus palaeolestes 
Asilus peritulus 
Asilus piceus 
Asilus platitarsatus 
Asilus platyceras 
Asilus podagricus 
Asilus poecilopus 
Asilus pubescens 
Asilus pumilus 
Asilus punctatus 
Asilus pusio 
Asilus regius 
Asilus rufibarbis 
Asilus rufipalpis 
Asilus sabulosus 
Asilus sackeni 
Asilus sannoisiensis 
Asilus saulcyi 
Asilus schedius 
Asilus scutellatus 
Asilus sericans 
Asilus sericeus 
Asilus servillei 
Asilus striatus 
Asilus superveniens 
Asilus tangeri 
Asilus tarsosus 
Asilus tasmaniae 
Asilus tatius 
Asilus tenuiventris 
Asilus tesselatus 
Asilus therevinus 
Asilus tibialis 
Asilus tibialis 
Asilus tibialis 
Asilus tingitanus 
Asilus trichurus 
Asilus trifarius 
Asilus tristis 
Asilus versicolor 
Asilus vescus 
Asilus villosus 
Asilus viridescens 
Asilus viridis 
Asilus wickhami

Asiola 
Asiola atkinsi 
Asiola blasio 
Asiola fasciata 
Asiola lemniscata

Aspidopyga 
Aspidopyga cophuroides

Astochia 
Astochia africana 
Astochia annulipes 
Astochia armata 
Astochia bromleyi 
Astochia canis 
Astochia caspica 
Astochia ceylonica 
Astochia cirrisetosa 
Astochia completa 
Astochia determinata 
Astochia flava 
Astochia grisea 
Astochia guptai 
Astochia hindostani 
Astochia hircus 
Astochia hulli 
Astochia indica 
Astochia inermis 
Astochia introducens 
Astochia jayarami 
Astochia karikalensis 
Astochia lancealata 
Astochia longistylus 
Astochia maculipes 
Astochia melanopygus 
Astochia metatarsata 
Astochia muralidharani 
Astochia neavensis 
Astochia nigranta 
Astochia nigrinus 
Astochia philus 
Astochia pseudoguptai 
Astochia rami 
Astochia scalaris 
Astochia shishodiai 
Astochia silcharensis 
Astochia sodalis 
Astochia spinicauda 
Astochia strachani 
Astochia tarsalis 
Astochia tiwarii 
Astochia trichura 
Astochia trigemina 
Astochia virgatipes

Astylopogon 
Astylopogon catharinae

Aterpogon 
Aterpogon cyrtopogonoides

Atomosia 
Atomosia anacaona 
Atomosia anonyma 
Atomosia appendiculata 
Atomosia argyrophora 
Atomosia armata 
Atomosia barbiellinii 
Atomosia beckeri 
Atomosia bequaerti 
Atomosia bigoti 
Atomosia cerverai 
Atomosia ciguaya 
Atomosia coxalis 
Atomosia cyanescens 
Atomosia danforthi 
Atomosia dasypus 
Atomosia echemon 
Atomosia fredericoi 
Atomosia frontalis 
Atomosia geniculata 
Atomosia glabrata 
Atomosia hondurana 
Atomosia jagua 
Atomosia jimagua 
Atomosia limbata 
Atomosia limbiventris 
Atomosia lineata 
Atomosia macquarti 
Atomosia maestrae 
Atomosia melanopogon 
Atomosia metallescens 
Atomosia metallica 
Atomosia mucida 
Atomosia mucidoides 
Atomosia nigroaenea 
Atomosia nuda 
Atomosia panamensis 
Atomosia pilipes 
Atomosia pubescens 
Atomosia puella 
Atomosia punctifera 
Atomosia pusilla 
Atomosia rica 
Atomosia rosalesi 
Atomosia rufipes 
Atomosia sayii 
Atomosia scoriacea 
Atomosia selene 
Atomosia sericans 
Atomosia setosa 
Atomosia similis 
Atomosia tenuis 
Atomosia tibialis 
Atomosia unicolor 
Atomosia venustula 
Atomosia yurabia

Atoniomyia 
Atoniomyia albifacies 
Atoniomyia ancylocera 
Atoniomyia brevistylata 
Atoniomyia duncani 
Atoniomyia fulvipes 
Atoniomyia grossa 
Atoniomyia hispidella 
Atoniomyia laterepunctata 
Atoniomyia mikii 
Atoniomyia mollis 
Atoniomyia pinguis 
Atoniomyia scalarata 
Atoniomyia setigera 
Atoniomyia viduata

Atractia 
Atractia psilogaster 
Atractia pulverulenta

Atractocoma 
Atractocoma nivosa

Austenmyia 
Austenmyia amazona

Austrosaropogon 
Austrosaropogon barbula 
Austrosaropogon celaenops 
Austrosaropogon claviger 
Austrosaropogon gephyrion 
Austrosaropogon horsleyi 
Austrosaropogon insulanus 
Austrosaropogon melanops 
Austrosaropogon montanus 
Austrosaropogon nigrinus 
Austrosaropogon nigritibia 
Austrosaropogon palleucus 
Austrosaropogon periscelis 
Austrosaropogon thule

Aymarasilus 
Aymarasilus inti

References 

 
Asilidae